Harold Hairston (April 6, 1922 – August 25, 1998) was an American Negro league pitcher in the 1940s.

A native of Raleigh, West Virginia, Hairston served in the United States Army Air Forces during World War II. He made his Negro leagues debut in 1946 with the Homestead Grays, and played with the Grays again the following season. Hairston died in Cleveland, Ohio in 1998 at age 76.

References

External links
 and Seamheads

1922 births
1998 deaths
Homestead Grays players
Baseball pitchers
Baseball players from West Virginia
People from Raleigh County, West Virginia
United States Army Air Forces personnel of World War II
20th-century African-American sportspeople
African Americans in World War II
African-American United States Army personnel